Electoral college elections are scheduled for held on 15 March 2023 to elect the members of the electoral colleges for the Senate of the Caribbean Netherlands and Dutch expatriates. The elections will be held on the same day as the island council elections in the Caribbean Netherlands, and the provincial and water board elections in the European Netherlands.

Results

Electoral College for Non-Residents

See also 
 2023 Dutch Senate election

References 

2023 elections in the Caribbean
Electoral college
March 2023 events in North America
Elections in Bonaire
Elections in Saba (island)
Elections in Sint Eustatius